Damrong Wongthong ( b. March 20, 1965) is a Thai Luk thung singer.

Early life
He was born in Ratchaburi Province.

Career
He started on stage in 1995. He recorded a compact cassette and the cousin of Cholathee Thanthong, a songwriter, heard it one day. Colathee's cousin took the cassette to Cholathee which led to Cholathee introducing him to Sure Entertainment label.

His popular songs include "Num Rachaphak", "Proad Phit Cha Rana", "Duen Krueng Duang", "Nang Sao Helen" and "Phoo Ying Khon Sud Tay".

Discography

Album
 1995 – Yang Rak Samer ยังรักเสมอ
 1997 – Mai Rak Mai Wa ไม่รักไม่ว่า
 1999 – Proad Phit Cha Rana โปรดพิจารณา
 2000 – Jong Keb Jai Roae จงเก็บใจรอ
 2001 – Num Rachaphak หนุ่มราชภัฏ
 2003 – Sanae Num เสน่ห์หนุ่ม
 2004 – Phleng Ek เพลงเอก
 2006 – Phoo Ying Khon Sud Thai ผู้หญิงคนสุดท้าย

References

1965 births
Living people
Damrong Wongthong
Damrong Wongthong
Damrong Wongthong